The Institut des systèmes intelligents et de robotique (ISIR; English: Institute of Intelligent Systems and Robotics) is a French research institute supporting advanced research in robotics and intelligent systems. It is located in Paris. It is a public research institute in a partnership with the Sorbonne University.

Notable Researcher 
 Catherine Pelachaud, a French computer scientist specializing in human–computer interaction

References

External link 
 Official website 

Research institutes in France
Education in Paris